De La Rue plc is a British company headquartered in Basingstoke, England, that designs and produces banknotes, secure polymer substrate and banknote security features (including security holograms, security threads and security printed products) for central banks and currency issuing authorities. It is listed on the London Stock Exchange. In 2019, it was the world's largest commercial printer.

History
The company was founded by Thomas de la Rue, who moved from Guernsey to London in 1821 and set up in business as a 'Leghorn' straw hat maker, then as a stationer and printer. In 1831 he secured his business a Royal Warrant to produce playing cards. In 1855 it started printing postage stamps and in 1860 banknotes. The company's first banknotes were made for Mauritius. In 1896, the family partnership was converted into a private company.

In 1921, the de la Rue family sold their interests. The company was first listed on the London Stock Exchange in 1947. Then called Thomas De La Rue & Company, Limited, it changed its name in 1958 to The De La Rue Company Limited. A takeover bid for De La Rue was made by the Rank Organisation in 1968, but this was rejected by the Monopolies commission as being against the public interest. In 1991 the company's name was changed again – this time to De La Rue plc.

In 1965 De La Rue established a joint venture with the Italian printer and inventor Gualtiero Giori called De La Rue Giori. Based in Switzerland, the company specialized in building banknote printing equipment. The company printed banknotes for the Central Bank of Iran during the 1960s.

In 1995, the company acquired Portals Limited which had been listed on the London stock market since 1904. For almost 300 years Portals had been one of the leading banknote paper manufacturers in the world, having manufactured banknote paper for the Bank of England since 1724.

In 1997, De La Rue acquired Harrison and Sons, the stamp and banknote printers based in High Wycombe. The factory closed permanently in 2003.

In early 2002, De La Rue purchased Sequoia Voting Systems, a California based company that was a large provider of electronic voting systems in the United States, from Jefferson Smurfit plc for $23 million. After losing money for three years in a business way out of the company's traditional lines, in March 2005 Sequoia was sold to Smartmatic, a multi-national technology company which had developed advanced election systems, voting machines included.

Following the Panama Papers leak, it was revealed that from 2002 until 2010, De La Rue had secretly contracted New Delhi businessman Somendra Khosla to obtain contracts in exchange for a 15% commission.

In 2003, the company acquired the Debden based banknote printing operations of the Bank of England. In 2003 and 2004 the company supplied banknotes to Iraq.

The company was recognised by Hermann Simon as a role model for other small- to medium-sized businesses in his book Hidden Champions.

The Highest Perfection, a history of De La Rue was published in 2011. Written by Peter Pugh for De La Rue, it covered the years 1712–2003.

In August 2014, the company announced the appointment of Martin Sutherland (formerly of BAE Systems Applied Intelligence) as chief executive officer.

In 2016, the Cash Handling division (Cash Processing Systems) was sold to Privet Capital. In December 2016, the company announced it had purchased the DuPont Authentication division.

In March 2018, the company sold the paper business. De La Rue retained a 10% share in the new business, Portals International Limited. In April 2018, the company decided to appeal against the decision of the British government to manufacture passports in France. It subsequently decided against appealing.

In October 2019 the company sold its Identity Solutions business to HID Global for £42m.

On 26 July 2019, the Serious Fraud Office opened an investigation into De La Rue plc for suspected corruption in South Sudan. They later decided to close the case.

Operations

Banknotes
De La Rue sells high-security paper and printing technology for over 69 national currencies.

Security printing and papermaking
De La Rue also produces a wide range of other secure documents, including:
 Bank cheques
 Driving licences
 Tax stamps
 Food Vouchers

Past products

Playing cards
In 1843, De La Rue established its first overseas trade, as De La Rue's brother Paul travelled to Russia to advise on the making of playing cards. Thomas de la Rue's designs for playing cards are the basis for the modern standard design. The playing card business was sold to John Waddington in 1969.

Postage stamps
The company has also printed postage stamps for the United Kingdom and some of its colonies, for Italy and for the Confederate States of America. Some famous stamps such as the Cape of Good Hope triangulars were printed by De La Rue & Co. after Perkins Bacon fell out of favour with the postal authorities of the time. The first 50 years of postage stamp production were chronicled in John Easton's The De La Rue History of British and Foreign Postage Stamps 1855–1901 (Faber & Faber, London, 1958).

Writing instruments
De La Rue claims to have developed the first practical fountain pen in 1881 and was a leading manufacturer of fountain pens in Britain.  Products were marketed under the "Onoto" brand.  Production of fountain pens by De La Rue ceased in Britain in 1958 but continued for a few more years in Australia.

Board games
During the 1930s De La Rue created a number of board games. These included a cricket game, Stumpz, which was produced in a number of different editions, and Round The Horn, a game which re-created the then annual race of grain-laden, square-rigged sailing cargo ships from Australia to London. The games consisted of high quality components and used playing cards as part of the component set.

Gallery of products produced by De La Rue

See also 
 List of mints
 Banknotes of the pound sterling
 Commonwealth banknote-issuing institutions
 Gemalto – a competitor
 Giesecke & Devrient – a competitor based in Munich
 Hong Kong Note Printing – founded in 1984 by Thomas De La Rue

References

External links 

 
History of De La Rue’s playing cards
A research website with more detail of De La Rue company history
Article and images of 1930s De La Rue Board Game, Stumpz

Companies listed on the London Stock Exchange
Manufacturing companies established in 1821
1821 establishments in England
Manufacturing companies of the United Kingdom
Postage stamps of the United Kingdom
Banknote printing companies
Playing card manufacturers
Companies based in Basingstoke
British brands
British companies established in 1821